Blackburnia is a genus of beetles in the family Carabidae, containing the following species:

 Blackburnia aaae (Liebherr & Samuelson, 1992)
 Blackburnia abax (Sharp, 1903)
 Blackburnia abaxoides Liebherr, 2000
 Blackburnia agilis (Sharp, 1903)
 Blackburnia agonoides (Sharp, 1903)
 Blackburnia alternans (Sharp, 1903)
 Blackburnia ambiens (Sharp, 1903)
 Blackburnia anomala (Blackburn, 1878)
 Blackburnia asquithi Liebherr, 2000
 Blackburnia aterrima (Sharp, 1903)
 Blackburnia atra Liebherr, 2000
 Blackburnia auana Liebherr, 2000
 Blackburnia audax (Perkins, 1917)
 Blackburnia barda (Blackburn, 1877)
 Blackburnia bartletti Liebherr, 2000
 Blackburnia blaptoides (Blackburn, 1878)
 Blackburnia brevipes (Sharp, 1903)
 Blackburnia bryophila Liebherr, 2000
 Blackburnia calathiformis (Sharp, 1903)
 Blackburnia calathoides (Sharp, 1903)
 Blackburnia caliginosa (Blackburn, 1877)
 Blackburnia cephalotes (Sharp, 1903)
 Blackburnia cheloniceps (Perkins, 1917)
 Blackburnia concolor (Sharp, 1903)
 Blackburnia constricta (Sharp, 1903)
 Blackburnia corrusca (Erichson, 1834)
 Blackburnia costata (Sharp, 1903)
 Blackburnia cuneipennis (Blackburn, 1877)
 Blackburnia curtipes (Sharp, 1903)
 Blackburnia debilis (Perkins, 1917)
 Blackburnia depressa (Sharp, 1903)
 Blackburnia derodera (Sharp, 1903)
 Blackburnia dyscolea (Sharp, 1903)
 Blackburnia elegans (Sharp, 1903)
 Blackburnia epicurus (Blackburn, 1877)
 Blackburnia erro (Blackburn, 1878)
 Blackburnia erythropus (Sharp, 1903)
 Blackburnia ewingi Liebherr, 2000
 Blackburnia filipes (Sharp, 1903)
 Blackburnia fordi Liebherr, 2000
 Blackburnia fossipennis (Blackburn, 1877)
 Blackburnia foveolata Liebherr, 2000
 Blackburnia fracta (Sharp, 1903)
 Blackburnia fractistriata (Perkins, 1917)
 Blackburnia fraterna (Blackburn, 1877)
 Blackburnia fraudator (Sharp, 1903)
 Blackburnia frigida Blackburn, 1878
 Blackburnia fugitiva (Blackburn, 1877)
 Blackburnia fulgida Liebherr, 2000
 Blackburnia gastrellariformis Liebherr, 2001
 Blackburnia gracilis (Sharp, 1903)
 Blackburnia hakeakapa Liebherr, 2000
 Blackburnia haleakala Liebherr, 2000
 Blackburnia hawaiiensis (Sharp, 1903)
 Blackburnia hihia Liebherr, 2000
 Blackburnia hilaris (Perkins, 1917)
 Blackburnia howarthi Liebherr & Samuelson, 1992
 Blackburnia huhula Liebherr, 2000
 Blackburnia incendiaria (Blackburn, 1879)
 Blackburnia insignis Sharp, 1903
 Blackburnia insociabilis (Blackburn, 1878)
 Blackburnia ipu Liebherr, 2000
 Blackburnia kahili Liebherr, 2000
 Blackburnia kamehameha Liebherr, 2000
 Blackburnia kauaiensis (Sharp, 1903)
 Blackburnia kauwa Liebherr, 2000
 Blackburnia kilauea Liebherr, 2000
 Blackburnia kipahulu Liebherr, 2000
 Blackburnia koebelei (Sharp, 1903)
 Blackburnia komohana Liebherr, 2000
 Blackburnia kuiki Liebherr, 2000
 Blackburnia kukui Liebherr, 2000
 Blackburnia lanaiensis (Sharp, 1903)
 Blackburnia lanaihalensis Liebherr, 2000
 Blackburnia lata Liebherr, 2003
 Blackburnia latifrons (Sharp, 1903)
 Blackburnia lenta (Sharp, 1903)
 Blackburnia lihau Liebherr, 2000
 Blackburnia limbata (Sharp, 1903)
 Blackburnia longipes (Sharp, 1903)
 Blackburnia longula (Sharp, 1903)
 Blackburnia lucipetens (Blackburn, 1879)
 Blackburnia maculata (Sharp, 1903)
 Blackburnia mandibularis Liebherr, 2000
 Blackburnia medeirosi Liebherr, 2000
 Blackburnia meticulosa (Blackburn, 1877)
 Blackburnia metromenoides (Perkins, 1917)
 Blackburnia micans (Sharp, 1903)
 Blackburnia micantipennis (Sharp, 1903)
 Blackburnia microps (Sharp, 1903)
 Blackburnia moerens (Sharp, 1903)
 Blackburnia molokaiensis (Sharp, 1903)
 Blackburnia munroi (Perkins, 1936)
 Blackburnia muscicola (Blackburn, 1877)
 Blackburnia mutabilis (Blackburn, 1877)
 Blackburnia mystica (Blackburn, 1877)
 Blackburnia oceanica (Blackburn, 1877)
 Blackburnia octoocellata (Karsch, 1881)
 Blackburnia opaca (Sharp, 1903)
 Blackburnia optata (Sharp, 1903)
 Blackburnia optima (Sharp, 1903)
 Blackburnia palmae (Blackburn, 1877)
 Blackburnia paloloensis Liebherr, 2000
 Blackburnia paludicola Liebherr, 2000
 Blackburnia pauma Liebherr, 2000
 Blackburnia pavida (Sharp, 1903)
 Blackburnia perkinsi (Sharp, 1903)
 Blackburnia perpolita (Sharp, 1903)
 Blackburnia pilikua Liebherr, 2000
 Blackburnia platynoides (Sharp, 1903)
 Blackburnia platyophthalmica Liebherr, 2000
 Blackburnia polhemusi Liebherr, 2000
 Blackburnia polipoli Liebherr, 2000
 Blackburnia posticata (Sharp, 1903)
 Blackburnia proterva (Blackburn, 1877)
 Blackburnia proterva (Blackburn, 1877)
 Blackburnia pukalaina Liebherr, 2000
 Blackburnia puncticeps (Sharp, 1903)
 Blackburnia putealis (Blackburn, 1881)
 Blackburnia rupicola (Blackburn, 1878)
 Blackburnia sharpi (Blackburn, 1878)
 Blackburnia sphodriformis (Sharp, 1903)
 Blackburnia sulcipennis (Sharp, 1903)
 Blackburnia tantalus (Blackburn, 1877)
 Blackburnia terebrata (Blackburn, 1881)
 Blackburnia tibialis (Sharp, 1903)
 Blackburnia transiens (Sharp, 1903)
 Blackburnia tricolor (Sharp, 1903)
 Blackburnia ulaula Liebherr, 2000
 Blackburnia vagans (Sharp, 1903)
 Blackburnia viridis Liebherr, 2000
 Blackburnia waialeale Liebherr, 2000

References

Platyninae